A flower is a reproductive structure found in many plants.

Flower or Flowers may also refer to:

Places
Flower, West Virginia, United States
Flowers, Mississippi, United States
Flowers, North Carolina, United States
Hua Islet ('flower islet'), Wangan Township, Penghu County, Taiwan

People
Flower (name), a surname and given name
Flowers (name), a surname
Marc-André Fleury, an ice hockey goaltender known as "Flower"

Arts, entertainment, and media

Fictional characters
Flower (Meerkat Manor), a meerkat
 Flower, a character in the movie Bambi
 Flowey the Flower, a character from Undertale

Films
Flower (film), a 2017 American film
Flowers (2014 film), a Spanish film

Games
Flower (video game), a 2009 video game for the PlayStation 3
Flowers (video game series)

Music

Groups and labels
Flower (American band), an American indie rock band (1986–1990)
Flower (Japanese group), a Japanese pop girl group
Flower (South Korean band), a South Korean band
Flower Flower, a Japanese band headed by singer-songwriter Yui
The Flowers (Chinese band), a pop rock band
The Flowers (Scottish band), a post-punk band
Icehouse (band) or Flowers, an Australian rock band

Albums and EPs
 Flowers (Ace of Base album), a 1998 album by Ace of Base
 Flower (Akira Jimbo album), a 1997 album by Akira Jimbo
 Flowers (Casiopea album), a 1996 album by Casiopea
 Flowers (Echo & the Bunnymen album), a 2001 album by Echo & the Bunnymen
 Flower (EP), a 2013 EP by Yong Jun-hyung
 Flowers (The Emotions album), a 1976 album by The Emotions
 Flowers (Joan of Arc album), a 2009 album by Joan of Arc
 Flower (Jody Watley album), a 1998 album by Jody Watley
 Flowers (Jennifer Paige album), a greatest hits album of American pop singer Jennifer Paige
 Flowers (The Rolling Stones album), a 1967 album by The Rolling Stones
 Flower (XIA album), a 2015 album by Korean singer Kim Junsu (XIA)
 Fake It Flowers, a 2020 album by Beabadoobee

Songs
"Flower" (Gackt song), 2009
"Flower" (GFriend song), 2019
"Flower" (Koda Kumi song), 2005
"Flower" (L'Arc-en-Ciel song), 1996
"Flower" (Atsuko Maeda song), 2011
"Flower" (Kylie Minogue song), 2012
"Flower" (Soundgarden song), 1989
"Flower" (Tomiko Van song), 2006
"Flower" (Sonic Youth song), 1985
"Flower", a song by Liz Phair from her 1993 album Exile in Guyville
"Flower", a song by Moby from his 2000 compilation album Play: The B Sides
"Flower", a song by Eels from their 1996 album Beautiful Freak
"Flower", a song by Relient K from their 2016 album Air for Free
"A Flower", a 1950 song by John Cage
"Flowers", a song by Gabi DeMartino from the 2018 EP Individual
"Flowers" (Billy Yates song), 1997
"Flowers" (Émilie Simon song), 2003
"Flowers" (Lauren Spencer-Smith song), 2022
"Flowers" (Miley Cyrus song), 2023
"Flowers" (Sweet Female Attitude song), 2000
 Covered by Nathan Dawe featuring Jaykae in 2020
"Flowers", a song by The New Radicals from their 1998 album Maybe You've Been Brainwashed Too
"Flowers", a song by The Psychedelic Furs from their 1980 album The Psychedelic Furs

Other uses in arts, entertainment, and media
Flowers (TV channel), a Kochi based Malayalam television channel
Flowers (magazine), a Japanese manga magazine
Flowers (TV series), a 2016 British black comedy TV series
Flowers Studio, a recording studio in Minneapolis
V Flower, a Vocaloid voice bank

Transport
Flower class (disambiguation), two classes of Royal Navy ships
GWR 4100 Class, a class of British steam locomotives

Other uses
Flowers Foods, an American bakery company
National Federation Party - Flower faction, a faction in the Fijian general election of September 1977

See also

the flower (disambiguation)
Deflower
Fleur (disambiguation)
Flora (disambiguation)
Floral (disambiguation)
Flour, a food powder
FLWOR, a type of expression in the XQuery programming language